Mónica Rebeca Quinteros Cabeza (born 5 July 1988) is an Ecuadorian professional footballer. She was part of the Ecuadorian squad for the 2015 FIFA Women's World Cup.

Club career
In February 2016, Quinteros joined Israeli Ligat Nashim club Kiryat Gat on a four-month contract.

International career
Quinteros represented Ecuador at the 2004 South American U-19 Women's Championship.

References

External links

 
 
 Profile  at FEF
 

1988 births
Living people
People from Santa Rosa, El Oro
Ecuadorian women's footballers
Women's association football forwards
F.C. Kiryat Gat (women) players
Ligat Nashim players
Ecuador women's international footballers
2015 FIFA Women's World Cup players
Pan American Games competitors for Ecuador
Footballers at the 2015 Pan American Games
Ecuadorian expatriate footballers
Ecuadorian expatriate sportspeople in Israel
Expatriate women's footballers in Israel
21st-century Ecuadorian women